Kinsley can refer to:

People
 Kinsley (given name)
 Billy Kinsley (born 1946), musician
 Colin Kinsley, Prince George, British Columbia (1996–2008)
 Craig Kinsley (born 1989), American Olympic javelin thrower
 Jessie Catherine Kinsley (1858–1938), American folk artist
 Michael Kinsley (born 1951), political journalist
 Sarah Kinsley (born 2001), American singer-songwriter

Places
 Kinsley, Kansas, United States
 Kinsley, West Yorkshire, England

See also

 Kingsley (disambiguation)
 Kinsey (disambiguation)